Joseph G. Ponterotto is an American psychologist, author and professor. He is currently a tenured professor of counseling psychology and the  Coordinator of the Mental Health Counseling Program at Fordham University's Graduate School of Education. He is a licensed psychologist and mental health counselor, as well as a psychobiographer and multicultural consultant. His research interests are in acculturation, racism, immigration, multicultural counseling and education, qualitative/quantitative research methods including scale development, the history of psychology, and psychobiography.

Ponterotto is known for his teaching style at Fordham University, where in he blends both traditional and experiential practices. As a practicing clinician he brings the richness and diversity of the therapeutic process into the curriculum.  He has also contributed over 100 peer-reviewed journal articles, 13 academic books, and other notable works to the field of multicultural counseling, assessment, and research, including the Handbooks of Multicultural Counseling, the Handbooks of Multicultural Assessment, and Preventing Prejudice: A Guide for Counselors, Educators, and Parents. Ponterotto is perhaps best known for his first work of psychobiography titled A Psychobiography of Bobby Fischer: Understanding the Genius, Mystery, and Psychological Decline of a World Chess Champion, which also led becoming a historical consultant on the 2015 Edward Zwick-directed film Pawn Sacrifice, starring Tobey Maguire as Bobby Fischer and Liev Schreiber as Boris Spassky.

Biography 
Ponterotto was born and raised in the Bronx, New York. He entered Iona College in New Rochelle, New York in 1976 and attained a bachelor's degree (B.A.) in Psychology. from the education institution In 1980. Soon after, he accepted an invitation into the Counseling Psychology Program at the University of California, Santa Barbara.  He started in the Master's program there for the first year and then met his mentor, Dr. Jesus Manual Casas who recommended that he transition into the doctoral program.  Ponterotto credits Casas for inspiring his interests in multicultural research and social advocacy. From September 1981 until his graduation  in May 1985, he was part of a team with his mentor who conducted research in the Chicano Community. During this time, Ponterotto and Cases engaged in  prolonged discussions on their life experiences and concepts such as unearned privilege, culture, oppression and injustice. He learned how to reflect on his own heritage and bilingualism and how this ties into important elements of life like identity development and professionalism.  Dr. Casas became the chair for Ponterretto's Doctoral dissertation, "The Effects of Select Parental Variables, Cognitive Home Stimulation, and Teacher-Child Interactive Behavior on the Academic Performance of Low-Income Mexican American Children".

Ponterotto credits minority scholars in multicultural research for sustaining his commitment and self-confidence as a graduate student and new professional in the field, including; Thomas Parham, Janet Helms, William Cross, Derald Wing Sue, and first and foremost Casas.

Ponterotto also acknowledges  his faculty colleagues and students at Fordham University for their roles in the evolution of his professional career, particularly his interest in qualitative research and how it can inform multicultural counseling. Since his arrival in 1987, Dr. Ponterotto cites Fordham leaders such as Leo Goldman and Merle Keitel for creating an academic environment that emphasized qualitative research. He also thanks his students, especially those he mentored in his early career, for shedding light on how these methods can be administered to thoroughly learn about a specific multicultural population while also generating a sense of social justice that honors and benefits the research participants as well as advancing science.

Career
Ponterotto is a tenured professor with over 30 years of teaching and administrative experience in the field of psychology.  From 1985 until 1987 he held the position of assistant professor in Counseling Psychology within the Department of Educational Psychology at the University of Nebraska-Lincoln. In 1987, he joined Fordham University's Graduate School of Education as an assistant professor of Counseling Psychology in the Division of Psychological and Educational Services (PES).  Over the years at Fordham he was promoted to Associate and then Full Professor and has held a number of administrative positions.  Presently, he coordinates the master's degree program in Mental Health Counseling.

Ponterotto primarily teaches Master's and Doctoral students from a vast range of programs, such as;  school psychology, clinical psychology, mental health counseling, school counseling, and counseling psychology. He regularly teaches courses in multicultural counseling, psychological measurement and assessment, career counseling, quantitative/qualitative research methods, and history of psychology.

Counseling and supervision 
Ponterotto's professional work as a clinician started in 1981 when he saw his first clients while a graduate student at the University of California, Santa Barbara. In 1984 he attained the position of Clinic Coordinator and Supervisor of the Counseling Psychology Training Clinic at the University of California, Santa Barbara. In 1985, he became a counselor and supervisor at the Educational Psychology Training Clinic for the University of Nebraska-Lincoln and was later promoted to Director from 1986 to 1987.  In 2008, he opened his own small psychotherapy practice in New York City, where he specializes in examining the impact of different social-cultural contexts on the individual person, families, and career development. He also helps gifted clients (e.g., chess prodigies) pursue their talents while also managing healthy and balanced aspects of everyday life.

Awards and honors
Ponterotto has received several awards and honors that are university-based, national, and international. In 1994, he was a co-winner of the "Early Career Scientist/Practitioner Award," given by APA's Division 17. As a faculty member, he has received the Distinguished Contribution to Multicultural Education Award (1997-1998) and Scanlon Award (2003) from the Graduate School of Education. In 2007, he earned the Bene Merenti Award for 20 years of service at Fordham University. That same year he received the honor of "Distinguished Alumnus-Research and Scholarship" by the Graduate School of Education at the University of California, Santa Barbara. In addition, he was presented the "Visionary Leadership Award" at the APA National Multicultural Conference and Summit in Seattle, Washington. He also received the 17th Annual Janet E. Helms Award for Mentoring and Scholarship from Teachers College, Columbia University at the 24th Winter Roundtable on Cultural Psychology and Education.

Research contributions
Ponterotto contributes to research in psychology by essentially working "behind the scenes" of publishing academic literature and other resources, where he has served on editorial boards for various scholarly journals and book publishers.  He is also a former Associate Editor of the Journal of Counseling Psychology.  Ponterotto is an active researcher who has published over 100 peer-reviewed journal articles, which commenced while in his graduate studies. His research interests mirror the subjects he teaches, as he explores topics such as acculturation, racism, immigration, multicultural counseling and education, and qualitative/quantitative research methods.  For example, Dr. Ponterotto emphasizes throughout his works that qualitative inquiry approaches such as interviews with participants and their families are highly imperative for research, practice, training, empowering, and honoring different ethnicities, races, cultures and their respective beliefs, values and traditions. This view is evident within his most cited article named "Qualitative Research in Counseling Psychology: A Primer on Research Paradigms and Philosophy of Science." Published in 2005, this article presented an overview of research paradigms that have been used by psychologists in theory and practice and specifically urges that qualitative methods and other research alternatives are taken into account in order to effectively train future students.

Ponterotto is well known in academia for developing and advocating for innovative measures or scales (e.g., survey instruments) that are sensitive to cultural and ethnic differences to ensure that any research conducted or treatment initiatives are valid, appropriate, and inclusive. He is co-developer of the Quick Discrimination Index, the Teacher Multicultural Attitude Survey, the Multicultural Counseling Knowledge and Awareness Scale, and most recently, the Multicultural Personality Inventory. These measures are used worldwide.

Ponterotto is the co-author and or co-editor of 13 educational books.   Ponterotto is also the author of a  psychobiography (his first) on Bobby Fischer, titled  A Psychobiography of Bobby Fisher: Understanding the Genius, Mystery, and Psychological Decline of a World Chess Champion. Being an avid chess player himself,  Ponterotto decided to perform a detailed psychological evaluation on the trajectory of Bobby Fischer's life from his fame as a chess grandmaster at 15, which turned him into an international star and his being recognized as a prodigal genius, to his pitfalls and bizarre behaviors over time that ultimately led to his exile and death. His 2012 book is based on four years of research that included interviews with surviving family members, friends, chess masters, journalists, and biographers who knew Fischer as well as reviews of archives and available, FBI files related to the Fischer family. Based on the piecing together this agglomerated data, he was able to draw major conclusions that highlight Fischer's extraordinary intelligence and mental health challenges.  Ponterotto's psychobiography notably grabbed the attention of the producers of the 2015 major motion picture Pawn Sacrifice, for which he served as a historical consultant.

References

Living people
21st-century American psychologists
People from the Bronx
Year of birth missing (living people)
Iona University alumni
University of California, Santa Barbara alumni
21st-century American biographers
American male biographers
American psychology writers
20th-century American non-fiction writers
Fordham University faculty
University of Nebraska–Lincoln faculty
20th-century American male writers
Historians from New York (state)